Todd Taylor is an American five string banjo player. He held the Guinness Book of World Records title for "world's fastest banjo" until the record was beaten by Johnny Butten. In a demonstration of speed play he played "Dueling Banjos" by himself January 31, 2007 in Palm Bay, Florida at an event for Guinness Book of World Records.

Career
Todd Taylor began touring the Bluegrass circuit with his brother; together they were known as The Taylor Twins. He has played and toured with other notable bluegrass players including Bill Monroe, Carl Story, Jim & Jesse. Taylor became the first banjo player to take the Banjo to the Rock-n-Roll worldwide Top-40 countdown, with his remake of the classic rock tune "Free Bird". Taylor is a four-time Grammy Award nominee.

In 2018, the State Legislature of South Carolina designated March 14 as "South Carolina Banjo Day" in honor of Taylor.

Notable appearances
 Live with Regis and Kathy Lee: "Banjo and guitar picking sensations, the Taylor Twins, will perform this Thursday on the daytime television show, 'Live With Regis & Kathie.'"

Discography
 Something Different (2000)
 Fast Ride (2000)
 Blazing Bluegrass Banjo (2003)
 Taylor Made (2005)
 3-five-N (2006)
 Bringin' It... Home (2008)
 Diversity (2010)

References

External links
 
 Guinness World Record Todd Taylor Fastest Banjo
 Todd Taylor at Lost Gold Records

American banjoists
Living people
Year of birth missing (living people)